Middlesex was a constituency of the House of Commons of the Parliament of England, then of the Parliament of Great Britain from 1707 to 1800, then of the Parliament of the United Kingdom from 1801 until abolished in 1885.  It returned two members per election by various voting systems including hustings.

Boundaries and boundary changes

This county constituency until 1832 covered all the historic county of Middlesex, in south-eastern England, comprising Spelthorne, Poyle, South Mimms and Potters Bar in other modern counties, together with the north, west, and north-west sectors of the present-day Greater London.  Apart from the ability of some voters to participate in the borough franchises of the cities of London and Westminster (after dates of their inception, see top right or below), it gave rise to three more urban offshoot divisions in 1832, one of which was split in two at the next national review or reform, in 1868.  Its southern boundary was the River Thames.

The county seat returned two Members of Parliament (sometimes referred to by the medieval term of knights of the shire). The place of election for the county was until 1700 at Hampstead Heath, thereafter at The Butts in the town centre of Brentford.  Hustings were typically over a period of a fortnight when candidates set out their stall, and visible bribery had become not uncommon in closer contests around the country in such larger seats at the time, inspiring William Hogarth’s series of four pictures titled ‘Four Prints of An Election’ (when printed).

Until 1832 the county franchise was limited to forty shilling freeholders. The decrease in the value of money due to inflation and the expansion of the wealth and population as the urbanised area in the east around London and Westminster grew contributed to gradually expanding the electorate. The county was estimated by Henning to have about 1,660 voters in 1681. Sedgwick estimated about 3,000 in the 1715–54 period. Namier and Brook suggested there were about 3,500 in 1754–90. The number had reached about 6,000 by 1790–1820, according to Thorne.  Close elections between popular candidates would therefore be expensive - the worth of being a local magistrate, major landowner or other dignitary carrying little weight among such a generally urban and numerous upper-middle class forming the bulk of the electorate.

For subsequent changes in the franchise see Reform Act 1832 and Reform Act 1867. From 1832 voters were registered; the size of the electorate is shown below.

The geographic county until 1885 also contained the borough constituencies of City of London (first recorded as having its extraordinary four members from 1298) and Westminster (enfranchised with two members from 1545). In 1832 three two-seat Boroughs were added (or enfranchised): Finsbury, Marylebone, and Tower Hamlets. In 1867 two new parliamentary boroughs each returning two MPs were constituted: 'Hackney' (St. Leonard's, Shoreditch, St Matthew's Bethnal Green and St John's Hackney) formerly represented in borough elections via Tower Hamlets and 'Chelsea' (parishes of Chelsea, Kensington, Hammersmith and Fulham). The single-member non-territorial University constituency of London University (1868–1950) was somewhat connected to the county by having most of its graduates eligible to vote.

Possession of a county electoral qualification, deriving from owning various types of property or having ecclesiastical 'offices' (controversially and sporadically defined) in an area not otherwise represented, conferred the right to vote in the county elections.

An 1885 redistribution of seats saw Middlesex and its early breakaway seats in and around the City reformed under the Redistribution of Seats Act 1885 reflecting the wider electorate of the Reform Act 1884 and need to 'liberate' boroughs, i.e. urban areas without properly apportioned representation: 
Constituencies in the urban south-east part that returned 18 MPs were replaced by 38 single-member seats.
the City of London constituency (loosely considered with the county) was reduced from 4 to 2 members.
the Middlesex constituency latterly covering the north, west and south-west of the county returning 2 MPs was replaced by 7 single-member seats.

Local government bodies
In 1889 the 40 urban constituencies that comprised the south-eastern part fell into (for local government) a County of London save for the much smaller City of London which remained a separate quasi-county and legal jurisdiction. The seven county divisions (constituencies) in the north and west of the historic county came under a new local government body, the administrative county of Middlesex.  Both counties were also known by their governing bodies' name, County Councils (abbreviated to LCC and MCC).  The seven successor seats were Brentford, Ealing, Enfield, Harrow, Hornsey, Tottenham and Uxbridge. These (and numerous later successor seats) had MCC local governance until its abolition in 1965.

Members of Parliament
Preliminary note: The English civil year started on Lady Day, 25 March, until 1752 (Scotland having changed to 1 January in 1600). The year used in the lists of Parliaments in this article have been converted to the new style where necessary. Old style dates for days between 1 January and 24 March actually referred to days after 31 December. No attempt has been made to compensate for the eleven days which did not occur in September 1752 in both England and Scotland as well as other British controlled territories (when the day after 2 September was 14 September), so as to bring the British Empire fully in line with the Gregorian calendar.

Constituency created (1265): See Montfort's Parliament for further details. Knights of the shire are known to have been summoned to most Parliaments from 1290 (19th Parliament of King Edward I of England) and to every one from 1320 (19th Parliament of King Edward II of England).

Knights of the shire 1265–1660
Some of the members elected during this period have been identified, but this list does not include Parliaments where no member has been identified before the reign of King Henry VIII. In the list (as opposed to the table below) the year given is for the first meeting of the Parliament, with the month added where there was more than one Parliament in the year. If a second year is given this is a date of dissolution. Early Parliaments usually only existed for a few days or weeks, so dissolutions in the same year as the first meeting are not recorded in this list If a specific date of election is known this is recorded in italic brackets. The Roman numerals in brackets, following some names, are those used to distinguish different politicians of the same name in 'The House of Commons' 1509-1558 and 1558–1603.

In this period, Parliament was not an institution with a regular pattern of elections and sittings. Therefore, a separate entry is made for each Parliament, even if the same Knight of the Shire served in successive Parliaments.

List of known Knights of the Shire before 1509

Table of Knights of the Shire 1509-1660

Notes:-
 a Speaker of the House of Commons.
 b Wroth ceased to be an MP after 11 May 1535. It is unknown if there was a by-election.
 c Hawkes ceased to be MP by May/June 1532. It is unknown if there was a by-election.
 d Hughes ceased to be an MP after January/April 1543. It is unknown if there was a by-election.
 e In theory the Long Parliament existed throughout the 1640–1660 term, as it could not be lawfully dissolved without its own consent which was not given until 1660. In practice all or part of the membership of the House of Commons were not permitted to sit for lengthy periods. Other bodies considered to be Parliaments existed within parts of the term of the Long Parliament.
 f Francklyn died and a by-election was held.
 g In December 1648, Gilbert was excluded from Parliament in Pride's Purge and the seat was left vacant.
 h Spencer is not recorded as having sat after Pride's Purge in December 1648.

Table of Members of the Commonwealth Parliaments 1653-1659

The county had three nominated members in the Barebones Parliament, four representatives in the First and Second and the usual two in the Third of the Protectorate Parliaments

Knights of the shire 1660–1885

Notes:-
 a Smithson, not the same man as the former member of the same name, changed his surname to Percy before the 1741 general election.
 b Byng received the courtesy title of Viscount Enfield in 1860.

Elections

General notes
In multi-member elections the bloc voting system was used. Voters could cast a vote for two candidates or "plump" for one, as they chose. The leading candidates with the largest number of votes were elected.

In by-elections, to fill a single seat, the first past the post system applied.

Table terms

Sources

Results of 1660-1790 are by History of Parliament Trust publications. The results from 1790–1832 are by Stooks Smith, thereafter his work becoming the footnotes for results by Craig.

Results 1660–1885

Parliament of England

 Note (1660) vote totals unavailable

 Note (1661) vote totals unavailable

 Note (1679): Roberts was not the same man as the 1660 candidate of the same name.

 Note (1679): Smyth is referred to as Smith in House of Commons 1660-1690, but Smyth seems to be correct from Leigh Rayment's list of baronets.
 Expulsion from the House of Peyton 

 Note (1685) vote totals unavailable. Smyth is referred to as Smith in House of Commons 1660-1690, but Smyth seems to be correct from Leigh Rayment's list of baronets.

 Note (1689) vote totals unavailable

 Choice of Russell to sit for Cambridgeshire

Parliament of Great Britain

 Death of Wolstenholme

 Death of Child

 Smithson (not the same person as the former MP of the same name) subsequently changed his surname to Percy

 Creation of Pulteney as 1st Earl of Bath

 Succession of Percy as 2nd Earl of Northumberland

 Appointment of Cooke as Joint Paymaster of the Forces

 Note (1768): Stooks Smith attributes 1,292 votes to Wilkes. Stooks Smith does not give candidates party labels in Middlesex until after this election.
 Death of Cooke

 Note (1768): Poll 6 days (Source: Stooks Smith)
 Expulsion from the House of Wilkes, declared incapable of being elected 3 February 1769

 Expulsion from the House of Wilkes, election declared void

 Expulsion from the House of Wilkes, election declared void 17 March 1769

 Election return of Wilkes amended to Luttrell by Parliament on 14 April 1769 and Luttrell seated as the MP 15 April 1769

 Death of Glynn

 Note (1790): The George Byng who contested Middlesex elections from this year is a different person from the one who stood previously

Parliament of the United Kingdom

 Note (1802): Poll 15 days (Source: Stooks Smith)
 Election of Burdett declared void 9 July 1804

 Note (1804): Poll 15 days (Source: Stooks Smith)
 Election of Mainwearing challenged by a petition of Burdett. Mainwaring unseated and Francis Burdett seated on 5 March 1805. (Source: The Times (of London), edition of 6 March 1805)
 Election of Burdett challenged by a petition of Mainwearing. Burdett unseated and George Boulton Mainwaring seated with effect from 10 February 1806. (Source: The Times (of London), edition of 10 February 1806)

 Note (1806): Poll 15 days (Source: Stooks Smith)

 Note (1820): Poll 12 days (Source: Stooks Smith)

 Note (1835): The Thomas Wood who contested Middlesex elections from this year is a different person from the one who was elected in 1779

Byng's death caused a by-election.

 12577

 

  

 Creation of Grosvenor as 1st Baron Ebury

 

 Byng became known by the courtesy title of Viscount Enfield when his father became 2nd Earl of Strafford in 1860

 Death of Hanbury

 

 

 Appointment of Hamilton as Vice-President of the Privy Council Committee on Education

 

 Appointment of Hamilton as First Lord of the Admiralty

 Constituency divided in the 1885 redistribution

See also
List of former United Kingdom Parliament constituencies
Unreformed House of Commons
List of parliaments of England
Duration of English, British and United Kingdom parliaments from 1660

References

Citations

Sources 

 British Parliamentary Election Results 1832-1885, compiled and edited by F.W.S. Craig (The Macmillan Press 1977)
 The House of Commons 1509-1558, by S.T. Bindoff (Secker & Warburg 1982)
 The House of Commons 1558-1603, by P.W. Hasler (HMSO 1981)
 The House of Commons 1660-1690, by Basil Duke Henning (Secker & Warburg 1983)
 The House of Commons 1715-1754, by Romney Sedgwick (HMSO 1970)
 The House of Commons 1754-1790, by Sir Lewis Namier and John Brooke (HMSO 1964)
 The House of Commons 1790-1820, by R.G. Thorne (Secker & Warburg 1986)
 The Parliaments of England by Henry Stooks Smith (1st edition published in three volumes 1844-50), second edition edited (in one volume) by F.W.S. Craig (Political Reference Publications 1973)
 Who's Who of British Members of Parliament: Volume I 1832-1885, edited by M. Stenton (The Harvester Press 1976)
D Brunton & D H Pennington, Members of the Long Parliament (London: George Allen & Unwin, 1954)
Cobbett's Parliamentary history of England, from the Norman Conquest in 1066 to the year 1803 (London: Thomas Hansard, 1808) 
 List of members nominated for Parliament of 1653 at British History Online 

Parliamentary constituencies in London (historic)
Constituencies of the Parliament of the United Kingdom established in 1265
Constituencies of the Parliament of the United Kingdom disestablished in 1885
Political history of Middlesex